Chaumont can refer to:

Places

Belgium
 Chaumont-Gistoux, a municipality in the province of Walloon Brabant

France
 Chaumont-Porcien, in the Ardennes département
 Chaumont, Cher, in the Cher département
 Chaumont-le-Bois, in the Côte-d'Or département
 Arrondissement of Chaumont, in the Haute-Marne département
 Chaumont, Haute-Marne, in the Haute-Marne département (often simply referred to in English as "Chaumont, France")
 Chaumont-Semoutiers Air Base, a former United States Air Force base
 Chaumont-la-Ville, in the Haute-Marne département
 Chaumont, Haute-Savoie, in the Haute-Savoie département
 Chaumont-sur-Loire, in the Loir-et-Cher département
 Château de Chaumont, a castle built in the 10th century
 Chaumont-sur-Tharonne, in the Loir-et-Cher département
 Chaumont-d'Anjou, in the Maine-et-Loire département
 Chaumont-devant-Damvillers, in the Meuse département
 Chaumont-sur-Aire, in the Meuse département
 Chaumont-en-Vexin, in the Oise département
 Chaumont, Orne, in the Orne département
 Chaumont-le-Bourg, in the Puy-de-Dôme département
 Chaumont, Yonne, in the Yonne département

Italy
 Chaumont, the French name for Chiomonte, a comune in the Province of Turin

United States
 Chaumont, New York, a village in Jefferson County

Surname
 Antoine-Martin Chaumont de La Galaizière (1697−1783), a French nobleman active at the court of Lorraine
 Lambert Chaumont (c. 1630–1712), a Flemish composer
 Madeleine Chaumont (1896–1973), French mathematics teacher
 Seigneurs of Chaumont, a French noble title, in particular
 Charles II d'Amboise, Seigneur de Chaumont, a French military commander in the Italian Wars

Other uses
 12281 Chaumont, an asteroid discovered in 1990
 Treaty of Chaumont, signed in Chaumont, Haute-Marne in March 1814  
 USS Chaumont, former name of the hospital ship USS Samaritan (AH-10)